Tecunumania is a genus of flowering plants belonging to the family Cucurbitaceae.

The genus was circumscribed by Paul Carpenter Standley and Julian Alfred Steyermark in Publ. Field Mus. Nat. Hist., Bot. Ser.23 on page 96 in 1944.

The genus name of Tecunumania is in honour of Tecun Uman (1500? – February 20, 1524), who was one of the last rulers of the K'iche' Maya people, in the Highlands of what is now Guatemala. 
 
Its native range stretches from southern Mexico down to Central America. It is found in the countries of Costa Rica, Ecuador, Guatemala and (south-eastern and southwestern) Mexico.

Species
As accepted by Kew;
 Tecunumania quetzalteca 
 Tecunumania stothertiae

References

Cucurbitaceae
Cucurbitaceae genera
Flora of Southeastern Mexico
Flora of Southwestern Mexico
Flora of Costa Rica
Flora of Guatemala
Flora of Ecuador